Azita Hajian (born 10 January 1958) is an Iranian actress.

Early life
She was born on 10 January 1958 in Narmak, Tehran. She graduated in theatre acting and directing from the Faculty of Dramatic Arts in Tehran, Azita Hajian started stage acting in 1975 and film acting in 1989 with Thief of Dolls (Mohammad Reza Honarmand). Due to her theatrical background in the field of children and teenagers, her first films were in the same field. She is one of the major teachers of acting in Iran.  She has also played in some TV series.

Personal life
She married Mohamad Reza Sharifinia in 1980. Their two daughters, Mehraveh and Melika are both actresses. Azita and Mohammad-Reza announced their divorce in December 2010, after nearly ten years of living separately.

Selected filmography
 The Extraordinary Journey, 1990
 Avinar, 1991
 Dayanbakh, 1992
 The Path to Glory
 The Snowman, 1994 (released in ’97)
 The Red Ribbon, 1998
 The Dead Wave, 2000.
 Under the Smoky Roof, 2017.
180° Rule, 2020.

References

External links

20th-century Iranian actresses
Iranian film actresses
Iranian stage actresses
Iranian theatre directors
People from Tafresh
1958 births
Living people